Copper chloride may refer to:

 Copper(I) chloride (cuprous chloride), CuCl, mineral name nantokite
 Copper(II) chloride (cupric chloride), CuCl2, mineral name eriochalcite